The Piano Trio No. 6 in G major, K. 564, was written by Wolfgang Amadeus Mozart in 1788 and is part of his series of piano trios. It is scored for piano, violin and cello.

Movements 
The work is in three movement form:

References

External links

Piano trios by Wolfgang Amadeus Mozart
Compositions in G major
1788 compositions